Inryō-ji ( is a Buddhist temple in Okayama City, Okayama Prefecture, Japan. It is also known as Inryo-ji, Inryou-ji, or Inryoji. It is a temple of the Myōshin-ji school of the Rinzai sect in Japanese Zen. The temple was founded in 1632 during the Edo period by Ikeda Tadakatsu (the former feudal lord of Okayama who ruled Bizen Province and four districts of Bitchū Province and undertook maintenance of Okayama Castle and expansion of the castle town).

History 
Although the temple has been rebuilt over the centuries, the latest reconstruction occurred in 1998. The temple was completely burnt down in an air raid on Okayama in the early morning of June 29, 1945, but the stone pagoda and water bowl, though burnt and chipped, still remain, showing the intensity of World War II. It caught fire in August 1898 during the Meiji period and was the first known renovation.

Temple as an artistic venue 
The temple's uniqueness is its focus on the arts. The temple's tatami room has been used as a venue for musical performances and other artistic events during art summits, such as choral speaking, film screenings, and dance shows, since 1999. The temple's 15th-generation chief priest, Shinyu Shinohara, organizes the events and works as a live sound engineer.

The venue has hosted acts all around the globe, including Jim O'Rourke, Ichiyo Izawa, Kirinji, Nicki Parrott, Yuko Ando, Ichiko Aoba, Peter Broderick, Laraaji, Reggie Washington, Akira Sakata, Simon Nabatov, Carol Welsman, Sylvain Chauveau, Kotringo, Brigid Mae Power, and Scott Hamilton. Some of these concerts were recorded by sound engineer Emre Ekici.

See also 

 For an explanation of terms concerning Japanese Buddhism, Japanese Buddhist art, and Japanese Buddhist temple architecture, see the Glossary of Japanese Buddhism.

References

Important Cultural Properties of Japan
Historic Sites of Japan
Zen gardens
Buddhist relics
Religious buildings and structures completed in 1632